Strofades (also called Strofadia, or Stromphides) is a group of two small Greek islands in the Ionian Islands. Administratively they are part of the Municipality of Zakynthos. The larger island, Stamfani,  has an old fortress/monastery built in 1241. The smaller is Arpia. Both are sparsely vegetated and rocky.

Birds
There is a strong avian presence on the islands, and hunting is prohibited. Species include Cory's shearwater (Calonectris diomedea) and migratory passerines. There is also a large spring migration of turtle doves (Streptopelia turtur). The islands have been recognised as an Important Bird Area (IBA) by BirdLife International because they support a breeding population of some 2,000-3,000 pairs of Scopoli's shearwaters.

Mythology
As the Strophades, they were identified as the dwelling-place of the Harpies. Virgil states that the Harpy drove the Trojans from the Strophades (Aeneid iii, 209 passim.). The islands are mentioned in The Divine Comedy (see List of cultural references in The Divine Comedy) and in passing in Chapter 10 of Rabelais' Fifth Book of Pantagruel.

According to legend, the islands' name, meaning "Islands of Turning," refers to Zetes and Calaïs, sons of Boreas, who voyaged with the Argonauts. Zetes and Calaïs rescued Phineus from the Harpies. They succeeded in driving the monsters away but did not kill them, as a request from the goddess of the rainbow, Iris, who promised that Phineas would not be bothered by the Harpies again. They were turned back at the Strophades by Iris while continuing their pursuit of the creatures. It is a popular etymology based on word similarities. Stormy winds prevailed on the island at times, in the form of a tornado, which the ancients used to identify with the phrase "στροφάδες άελλαι". This is confirmed by the names of the two main winds, the north (Ziti) and the south (Kalai).

References
Κουτελάκης Χαρ., Η «Οδύσσεια» του Ομήρου χωρίς Λαιστρυγόνες και τέρατα. Μια νέα προσέγγιση για την ανθρωπογεωγραφία της Μεσογείου,  Αθήνα 30 Δεκ. 2019, σελ. 235-236.
Κουτελάκης Χαρ., Παναγιά «Η Πάντων Χαρά» των Στροφάδων. Ένα εικονογραφικό παράλληλο στην Πάτμο, ΔωδΧρον. ΙΕ΄ (1993) 67-79.

External links
  Important Bird areas of Greece

Uninhabited islands of Greece
Islands of the Ionian Islands (region)
Islands of Greece
Important Bird Areas of Greece
Important Bird Areas of Mediterranean islands
Landforms of Zakynthos